Dempsie may refer to:

Surname
 Allan Dempsie (born 1982), Scottish footballer
 Brian Dempsie (born 1983), Scottish footballer
 Joe Dempsie (born 1987), British actor
 Mark Dempsie (born 1980), Scottish football player

Places
 Dempsie Henley State Jail, women's jail in Texas, named after judge Dempsie Henley